Petrus du Plessis (born 19 November 1996) is a South African cricketer. He made his List A debut for Free State in the 2018–19 CSA Provincial One-Day Challenge on 31 March 2019.

References

External links
 

1996 births
Living people
South African cricketers
Free State cricketers
Place of birth missing (living people)